The Veterans International Bridge at Los Tomates is one of three international bridges that span the Mexico–United States border between the cities of Brownsville, Texas, and Matamoros, Tamaulipas. It is also known as simply as the Veterans Bridge, the Los Tomates Bridge, the Expressway 77 Bridge, the Brownsville Expressway
Bridge, and on the Mexico side as the Puente Internacional General Ignacio Zaragoza. The bridge is owned and operated by Cameron County.

The bridge unites the Matamoros–Brownsville Metropolitan Area, which has a population of 1,136,995, making it the 4th largest metropolitan area on the Mexico-U.S. border.

Description

Opened in 1999, the Veterans International Bridge is presently the newest of the three bridges in the Brownsville area. The roadway consists of four lanes and a truck lane. The bridge also has sidewalks on both sides to accommodate pedestrian traffic. The bridge operates daily from 6 a.m. to midnight.

On the Brownsville side, the bridge connects to the southern terminus of I-69E / US 77 / US 83 and the Brownsville – Veterans Port of Entry. On the Matamoros side, it connects to the northern terminus of  Fed. 101 / Fed. 180.

In the fiscal year ending in September 2010, the bridge saw 1,607,271 crossings, approximately double that of the Los Indios Bridge but half of the number at the Gateway International Bridge. This corresponded to a toll revenue in excess of US$6.6 million.

Border crossing

The Brownsville Veterans Port of Entry opened in 1999 with the completion of the Veterans International Bridge at Los Tomates. It is the easternmost US-Mexico border crossing, and is by far the newest of the three crossings between Brownsville and Matamoros.

History

A key component of an initiative to construct the new Veterans International Bridge at Los Tomates was the careful coordination among U.S. and Mexican local, state, and federal agencies. The Los Tomates Expressway (Interstate 69E/U.S. Highway 77/83) Extension project linking Brownsville, Texas, with Matamoros, Mexico, included new, elevated main lanes; construction of frontage roads; and improvements to the International Boulevard intersection. Other significant aspects of the project were the relocation and construction of a new 47 acre (19-hectare) park and the dedication of a new 175 acre (71-hectare) wildlife preserve. With the completion of the bridge and 10 other projects, international trucking can now bypass the heavily congested downtown corridors of Brownsville and Matamoros.

Design and engineering

Design and Project management were completed by Maverick Engineering, Inc. – Design and project management of the Veterans’ International Bridge inbound traffic lane expansion. The scope of the project included the addition of one auto lane for fast access and several lanes for industrial traffic growth. One of these lanes was for the FAST processing of inbound NAFTA freight. The bridge connects with Interstate 69E/U.S. Highway 77/83 and is a major transit route for freight bound areas across the United States.

References

International bridges in Texas
International bridges in Tamaulipas
Buildings and structures in Brownsville, Texas
Transportation in Brownsville, Texas
Monuments and memorials in Texas
Road bridges in Texas
Bridges completed in 1999
Tolled sections of Interstate Highways
Toll bridges in Texas
Toll bridges in Mexico
Interstate 69
U.S. Route 77
U.S. Route 83
Bridges on the Interstate Highway System
Bridges of the United States Numbered Highway System